Juan Carlos Esguerra Portocarrero (born March 13, 1949) is a Colombian lawyer and politician. He has previously served in the Colombian Government as the 7th Minister of Justice and Law, the 28th Ambassador of Colombia to the United States, and as Minister of National Defence.

Career
On August 11, 2011, President Juan Manuel Santos Calderón appointed Esguerra Minister of Justice and Law of Colombia.

Personal life
Born to José María Esguerra Samper and Ana Portocarrero Mutis on March 13. 1949 in Bogotá, D.C., Colombia; he married Julia Miranda Londoño, on December 10, 1982 whom he met while she was a law student and he her law professor at the Pontifical Xavierian University. Together they have three children: Juan Carlos, Cristina, and Nicolás. His wife is the current Director of the National Natural Parks System of Colombia.

References

1949 births
Living people
People from Bogotá
Pontifical Xavierian University alumni
Cornell Law School alumni
Academic staff of the Pontifical Xavierian University
20th-century Colombian lawyers
Members of the Constituent Assembly of Colombia
Colombian Ministers of Defense
Ministers of Justice and Law of Colombia
Colombian politicians